Call on Me may refer to:

Music

Albums 
 Call on Me (album), a 1980 album by Evelyn King
 Call on Me, a 1963 album by Bobby Bland, and the title song

Songs 
 "Call on Me" (Chicago song), 1974
 "Call on Me" (Eric Prydz song), 2004
 "Call on Me" (Janet Jackson song), featuring Nelly, 2006
 "Call on Me" (Starley song), 2016
 "Call on Me" (Tanya Tucker song), 1989
 "Call on Me", by 1927 from The Other Side
 "Call on Me", by Andy Bell from Non-Stop
 "Call on Me", by Bad Company from Straight Shooter
 "Call on Me", by Big Brother and the Holding Company from Big Brother & the Holding Company
 "Call on Me", by Bread from On the Waters
 "Call on Me", by Captain Beefheart from Safe as Milk
 "Call on Me", by Eddie Money from Life for the Taking
 "Call on Me", by Four Tops, B-side of the single "Baby I Need Your Loving"
 "Call on Me", by Gilbert O'Sullivan
 "Call on Me", by James Ingram from It's Real
 "Call on Me", by Jody Watley from Affairs of the Heart
 "Call on Me", by John Anderson from All the People Are Talkin'
 "Call on Me", by Keke Wyatt from Soul Sista
 "Call on Me", by Laleh from Prinsessor
 "Call on Me", by Legend Seven from Blind Faith
 "Call on Me", by Lou Reed from The Raven
 "Call on Me", by Maze from Inspiration
 "Call on Me", by Michael Jackson from Farewell My Summer Love
 "Call on Me", by Primal Scream from Give Out But Don't Give Up
 "Call on Me", by Quicksilver Messenger Service from What About Me
 "Call on Me", by Sean Paul
 "Call on Me", by Spirit from California Blues
 "Call on Me", by Switch from Switch V
 "Call on Me", by Whitesnake from Good to Be Bad

See also 
 Call Me (disambiguation)
 "Valerie" (Steve Winwood song) (1982), which features the refrain "Call on me"